Cerasi is a surname. Notable people with the surname include:

 Angelo Cerasi (1643–1728), Italian Roman Catholic bishop
 Tiberio Cerasi (1544–1601), Italian jurist and papal treasurer-general

Italian-language surnames